Richard Grey, 3rd Earl of Tankerville, 8th Lord of Powys (5 November 1436 – c. 1466) fought on the side of the House of York in the War of the Roses.

Family
Sir Richard Grey was the son and heir of Henry Grey, 2nd Earl of Tankerville and Antigone Plantagenet (illegitimate daughter of Humphrey of Lancaster, 1st Duke of Gloucester).  He was born  at Pontesbury, Shropshire 5 November 1436.

He married before 12 January 1458/1459 Margaret Audley, daughter of James Tuchet, 5th Baron Audley, 2nd Baron Tuchet (c. 1398–1459), by his second wife, Eleanor, illegitimate daughter of Edmund Holland, 4th Earl of Kent and Constance of York.

Life
The Earldom of Tankerville lost its lands when France was lost to the English crown in 1453.

It does not appear "that this nobleman was ever summoned to parliament but strong evidence exists that he sat in assembly as a baron of the realm in 1455", when it is recorded that he swore allegiance to Henry VI as Sir Richard Grey, Lord of Powis.

In the Wars of the Roses he was with the Duke of York at the Battle of Ludford Bridge on 12 October 1459. His support for the house of York resulted in his being attainted with many others by the Lancastrian Henry VI in 1460, when the earl of Warwick ordered him to surrender Montgomery castle. All his hereditary titles were abolished by this attainder, bringing an end to this creation of the Earldom of Tankerville. The attainder would also have abolished the title of Baron of Powis. Henry VI reversed the attainder once he had control of the lands, and had received a promise of loyalty.

In 1461 when Yorkist Edward IV came to the throne Richard Grey received the stewardship of Kerry, Kedwen, and Montgomery. Continuing his Yorkist support, Richard Grey was with Richard Neville, 16th Earl of Warwick, at the siege of Alnwick Castle in November 1462 to take it back, after the Lancastrians had taken it by siege from the captaincy of his cousin Sir Ralph Grey of Heton.

Sir Richard Grey, Lord Grey of Powis, died 17 December 1466.  His widow, Margaret, married (2nd) (as his 2nd wife) Roger Vaughan, Knt.  Sir Roger Vaughan was executed at Chepstow in 1471.  His widow, Margaret, died before 2 Feb. 1480/1.

Sir Richard Grey and his wife, Margaret, had one son, John Grey (died 1497) usually considered the first of the Baron Grey of Powis, who married to Anne Herbert, daughter of William Herbert, 1st Earl of Pembroke and Anne Devereux.  They also had one daughter, Elizabeth Grey, who married Sir John Ludlow, KB, of Hodnet, Shropshire, in 1465.

References

1436 births
1460s deaths
Year of death uncertain
Richard
People from Montgomeryshire
15th-century English people
Earls of Tankerville (1418 creation)